Donatien is a masculine given name of French origin. People with that name include:

 Amédée Donatien Doublemard (1826–1900), French sculptor and medalist
 Donatien Alphonse François de Sade, (1740–1814), French nobleman, revolutionary politician, philosopher, and writer
 Donatien Bouché (1882–1965), French sailor who competed in the 1928 Summer Olympics
 Donatien de Bruyne (1871–1935), French biblical scholar, textual critic, and Benedictine
 Donatien Mortelette (born 1982), French rower
 Donatien Schauly (born 1985), French equestrian who competed in the 2012 Summer Olympics
 Donatien-Marie-Joseph de Vimeur, vicomte de Rochambeau (1755–1813), French soldier, son of Jean-Baptiste
 Émile-Bernard Donatien (1887–1955), French actor and film director
 Jacques-Donatien Le Ray de Chaumont (1726–1803), French aristocrat
 Jean-Baptiste Donatien de Vimeur, comte de Rochambeau (1725–1807), French nobleman and general during the American Revolution
 Donatien Laurent (1935-2020), Breton ethnologist.

See also
 Donatian (disambiguation)
 Donation (disambiguation)
 

French masculine given names